The stripe-throated yuhina (Yuhina gularis) is a bird species in the white-eye family Zosteropidae.

It is found from the Himalayas to southern China and central Vietnam. Its natural habitat is subtropical or tropical moist montane forests.

References

Collar, N. J. & Robson, C. 2007. Family Timaliidae (Babblers)  pp. 70 – 291 in; del Hoyo, J., Elliott, A. & Christie, D.A. eds. Handbook of the Birds of the World, Vol. 12. Picathartes to Tits and Chickadees. Lynx Edicions, Barcelona.

stripe-throated yuhina
Birds of North India
Birds of Nepal
Birds of Eastern Himalaya
Birds of Central China
Birds of Yunnan
Birds of Laos
Birds of Myanmar
Birds of Vietnam
stripe-throated yuhina
Taxonomy articles created by Polbot